The 2015 UCF Knights football team represented the University of Central Florida in the 2015 NCAA Division I FBS football season. The Knights were members of the East Division of the American Athletic Conference (The American), defending conference co-champions, and played their home games at Bright House Networks Stadium on UCF's main campus in Orlando, Florida. The Knights were led by head coach George O'Leary, who was in his 12th and final season with the team. After starting the season 0–6, O'Leary resigned as UCF's interim athletic director, a position he had held since June when Todd Stansbury left for the same position at Oregon State. Following UCF's 59–10 defeat by Houston on homecoming, dropping the Knights to an 0–8 record, O'Leary resigned as head football coach. Quarterbacks coach  Danny Barrett served as interim head coach for the remainder of the season.

The 2015 season was UCF's third in the American Athletic Conference, and the first year the conference split into two divisions. This was the Knights' first season since 2011 in which they would fail to be eligible for postseason play. This campaign marks UCF's third winless season in program history (along with the 1982 and 2004 seasons).

Coming just two years after the banner BCS-bowl-winning 2013 season that saw them finish in the top 10 nationally, and a year after winning the conference for the second straight year, the 2015 season was not just a failure, but a shocking one. In the aftermath, UCF finally moved on from the O'Leary era and hired renowned offensive coordinator Scott Frost from the Oregon Ducks to be their head coach. After a 6–7 2016 bounce-back campaign, the Knights would go undefeated in 2017 and win the Peach Bowl, completing a turnaround from 0–12 to 13–0 in just two years.

Personnel

Coaching staff

Roster

Recruiting class

Schedule
The 2015 schedule was officially released by The American on February 19, 2015. The 2015 schedule is the first for the conference under a new permanent system developed to address expanded membership and the creation of divisions. UCF will face eight conference opponents: Cincinnati, UConn, East Carolina, Houston, South Florida, Temple, Tulane, and Tulsa. The Knights will also play four non-conference games: Florida International (C-USA), Furman (FCS), South Carolina (SEC), and Stanford (Pac-12).

Source:

Game summaries

FIU

This was the fourth meeting between UCF and the FIU Golden Panthers, with the series tied 2–2. The Knights won the previous meeting, a 38–0 shutout at FIU in 2013. FIU got onboard first with a field goal. UCF then responded with two touchdowns by Jordan Akins to take a 14–3 lead at halftime. In the second half, the Knights were plagued with defensive struggles which allowed FIU to take the lead 15–14. UCF then set up within field goal distance with thirty-seconds left; however, a Matthew Wright field goal was blocked and FIU ran out the clock.

The loss was UCF's first to a Florida opponent since September 17, 2011, UCF's first meeting with FIU, as well as UCF's first home opener loss since 2007 to Texas. The loss also marks UCF's first home loss since September 28, 2013 to South Carolina, as well as UCF's first Thursday night loss since November 3, 2011 against Tulsa.

Stanford

This was the first meeting between UCF and the Stanford Cardinal. The trip represented the longest travel for any FBS team during the 2015 season, at 2,427 miles. The loss also results in UCF's second consecutive season starting with an 0–2 record.

Furman

This was the second meeting between UCF and the Furman Paladins, with the Paladins winning a 1984 game, 42–6. This was QB Bo Schneider's first career start, going 7-for-11 for 63 yards. UCF initially took a 12–0 lead, which included the first sacks of the season for defense, one of those resulting in a safety. After getting a turnover on downs, Furman scored a touchdown with 1:10 remaining in the half. At the third quarter, Tyler Harris started as QB. A few minutes into the 3rd quarter, Furman scored a 61-yard touchdown which gave them the lead 13–12. Towards the end of the quarter, UCF kicked a field goal to retake the lead 15–13. Furman responded with a 55-yard field goal to retake the lead 16–15. With forty-nine seconds remaining, QB Tyler Harris threw an interception which sealed the victory for the Paladins. The game marked the Knights first loss to an FCS team since ascending to Division I-A (FBS) in 1996 (20–1), as well as their first 0–3 start since 2004.

South Carolina

This was the fifth meeting between UCF and the South Carolina Gamecocks. With the loss, UCF remains winless against South Carolina. After falling behind 5–0, Bo Schneider, in his second career start, led the Knights to fourteen unanswered points to take a 14–5 lead with five minutes remaining in the second quarter. After entering halftime with a six-point lead, UCF was held scoreless in the second half. USC QB Lorenzo Nunez threw for two scores, Pharoh Cooper had two touchdowns, one rushing and one receiving, and K Elliott Fry had a field goal to give the Gamecocks a 31–14 win. The loss dropped the Knights to 0–4, the first time the team has started the season winless through four games since 2004, when UCF went 0–11.

Tulane

The game marked the seventh meeting between UCF and the Tulane Green Wave. UCF holds a 5–2 advantage against Tulane, losing for the first time in the series since 2006. The loss marks the first time UCF lost their first conference game of the season since 2009 when they fell to Southern Miss. After going ahead 7–0 with a pass from Bo Schneider to Jordan Franks, Tulane scored 24 unanswered points taking a 24–10 halftime lead. By the end of the 3rd quarter, Tulane took a 38–10 lead. Additionally, Bo Schneider was sacked 7 times for a total of 45 yards, one of those resulting in a fumble, and threw 3 interceptions, each resulting in Tulane touchdowns. Tyler Harris entered after the beginning of the 4th quarter and scored 3 touchdowns on all of his drives, each connecting to D'erren Wilson, who finished the game with 7 receptions, 114 yards, and 3 touchdowns.

UConn

This was the third meeting between UCF and the UConn Huskies. UCF beat UConn in 2013 62–17 in Orlando, while in 2014, UConn upset UCF 37–29 in East Hartford. As of the start of the 2015 season, the 2014 meeting was the only conference loss for UCF since joining The American. QB Justin Holman returned for the Knights after a three-game absence following his injury against Stanford. On the first drive, Holman led the Knights seventy-three yards but UCF had to settle for a 19-yard field goal from Matthew Wright. Afterwards the Huskies dominated the Knights both defensively and offensively and scored forty unanswered points to score their second consecutive victory over UCF. Through six games, the Knights were outscored 70–3 in the third quarter. 3 turnovers doomed the Knights, including Hayden Jones accidentally stepping out of his end zone on a kickoff return and going back in to take a knee that ended up giving UConn a safety in the 1st quarter.

This loss broke UCF's thirteen game home conference win streak dating back to November 25, 2011 against UTEP. This was also the lowest home attendance for a UCF game since November 25, 2011 against UTEP with an average of 26,669 fans. The 40–13 loss became the largest loss deficit in Bright House Networks Stadium history at this point, as well as the largest home loss deficit for UCF since they fell to Pittsburgh 52–7 in 2006 in the Citrus Bowl. The Knights are one of five winless teams remaining following week seven. Two days after the game, George O'Leary announced that he was stepping down as the interim director of athletics.

Temple

This will be the third meeting between UCF and the Temple Owls. UCF holds a 2–0 advantage, with their first victory involving a one-handed catch by JJ Worton in the final minutes of the 4th quarter, which to this day remains one of the best catches in college football. UCF then beat Temple 34–14 in Orlando in 2014, their last meeting. At the beginning of the second quarter, Temple got on top 14–3. Later on in the second quarter, UCF recorded their first interception of the season as Shaquill Griffin caught a pass by P.J. Walker and returned it for an 81-yard touchdown. At halftime, UCF trailed Temple 14–13 after a field goal by Matthew Wright. UCF then took the lead in the third quarter after another Matthew Wright field goal, 16–14. Temple, however, pulled away with two touchdowns both with 2-point conversions. 2 interceptions by Holman in the second half as well as penalties from offense ended UCF's quest for bowl eligibility for the first time since 2011.

Houston

This was the seventh meeting between UCF and the Houston Cougars. UCF  had won the previous four games, with the two most recent victories from defensive plays, both from Brandon Alexander. The Knights had a promising opening drive, which ended on an 85-yard fumble return for Houston to take a 7–0 lead. Afterwards, Holman connected with Tristan Payton for a 46-yard touchdown, the first of Payton's career, to tie the game 7–7. After taking a 10–7 lead in the second quarter the Knights allowed 52 unanswered points. The 49-point loss is the largest home-loss in UCF history, and the 59-points allowed is the fourth-most in program history. Following the loss, UCF head football coach George O'Leary resigned.

Cincinnati

This was the first meeting between UCF and the Cincinnati Bearcats. In a disastrous first game as interim head coach, Danny Barrett's team struggled offensively and defensively against his alma mater, the Cincinnati Bearcats. Cincinnati QB Gunner Kiel managed to complete all 15 of his passes for 319 yards and 5 TDs, as defense struggled tremendously despite the second interception of the season by Shaquill Griffin. Field goals were also a struggle for UCF this game, as the Knight's two field goal attempts were all missed. CJ Jones managed to score the only points for UCF in the 4th quarter to avoid the shutout.

Tulsa

This was the ninth meeting between UCF and the Tulsa Golden Hurricane. Tulsa holds a 5–3 advantage, but UCF won the most recent one in 2014 with a 31–7 blowout. UCF has yet to defeat Tulsa at H.A. Chapman Stadium. During the first quarter, Holman threw an underthrown deep pass to Tre'Quan Smith, who turned around and leaped over a Tulsa defensive back to catch the ball in midair. However, UCF trailed at halftime 24–3. UCF came alive in the third quarter and scored 2 touchdowns as well as a field goal to only trail 24–20 by the beginning of the 4th quarter, one of the touchdowns being the first of Taj McGowan's career. Additionally, defense recorded two interceptions by Brendin Straubel and Chequan Burkett, as well as a fumble forced by Tre Neal on a Tulsa kickoff return. UCF's offense ended up scoring on all of those opportunities. Despite this, Tulsa ended up pulling away with a 45–30 victory, which included a pick-six. As of this week, UCF is one of two winless teams, the other one being the Kansas Jayhawks.

East Carolina

This was the fourteenth meeting between UCF and the East Carolina Pirates. East Carolina has a 10–4 advantage, UCF had won the last two games, the most recent being in 2014 with a Hail Mary pass in the final seconds from Justin Holman to Breshad Perriman, 32–30. UCF's first drive ended on a Tre'Quan Smith TD while Jordan Franks caught a 44-yard pass beforehand. That was the last time the Knights scored. Plagued by turnovers and injuries, including one to starting QB Justin Holman, UCF lost 44–7 to East Carolina.

South Florida

This was the seventh meeting between UCF and the South Florida Bulls in the War On I–4. USF has a 5–2 advantage. UCF had won the last two, with the most recent giving the USF Bulls their first home shutout in school history as well as UCF's first victory at Raymond James Stadium, 16–0. This was the first game since 1995 that UCF wore both black jerseys and black pants. Similar to the last game, UCF ended up scoring only on their first drive, which was a field goal by Matthew Wright. UCF then allowed 44 unanswered points by the Bulls, which gave UCF their first loss to USF since 2008, as well as their first conference loss in the series. This was the 12th loss of the season, which made UCF finish winless for the third time in their history. UCF was not alone, as the Kansas Jayhawks finished their season 0–12 as well, both teams being the only FBS teams to go winless.

References

UCF
UCF Knights football seasons
College football winless seasons
UCF Knights football